Heisley is a surname. Notable people with the surname include:

 Michael Heisley (1937–2014), American businessman and sports owner
 Newt Heisley (1920–2009), American graphic designer

See also
 Hensley (surname)